The 1876 NYU Violets football team was an American football team that represented New York University in the 1876 college football season. The team played one game, losing to Stevens Institute of Technology by an 8–0 score.

Schedule

References

NYU
NYU Violets football seasons
College football winless seasons
NYU Violets football